Arianna Vanderpool-Wallace (born March 4, 1990) is a competitive swimmer and national record-holder from the Bahamas who has represented her country in international championships, including the Olympics, FINA world championships, and Pan American Games. She swam for the Bahamas at the 2008 Olympics and was the first Bahamian ever to make the final of their event.  She attended Auburn University in the United States, where she swam for the Auburn Tigers swimming and diving team in collegiate competition. At the 2007 Pan American Games she was part of the bronze medal winning women's 4 × 100 m medley relay alongside Alicia Lightbourne, Nikia Deveaux and Alana Dillette.  She is a graduate of swimming powerhouse The Bolles School.  She retired from competitive swimming in 2018.

She is the daughter of Bahamian politician Vincent Vanderpool-Wallace.

International tournaments
 Olympics: 2008, 2012 and 2016
 World Championships: 2009
 Pan American Games: 2007
 Central American & Caribbean Games: 2006 and 2010
 Olympics: 2012
 Commonwealth Games: 2014

Central  American & Caribbean Games
Vanderpool-Wallace won four gold medals at the 2010 games, in Women's 50 and 100m Freestyle and 50 and 100m Butterfly.  She also set games records of 54.87 for the 100m Freestyle and 26.46 for the 50m Butterfly.

Commonwealth Games 2014
Vanderpool-Wallace was the flag bearer for her nation at the opening ceremony.  She competed in three events: Women's 50m Freestyle, Women's 50m Butterfly and  Women's 100m Freestyle.  She won a silver medal in the 50m Butterfly with a time of 25.53, finished 4th in the 50m Freestyle with a time of 24.34 - a personal best - and fifth in the 100m Freestyle with 54.37.

Best times
 50m Freestyle: 24:31
 100m Freestyle: 53:73

See also
 List of Commonwealth Games medallists in swimming (women)

References

External links
 
 
 
 
 
 

1990 births
Living people
Bahamian female freestyle swimmers
Auburn Tigers women's swimmers
Swimmers at the 2008 Summer Olympics
Swimmers at the 2012 Summer Olympics
Swimmers at the 2016 Summer Olympics
Bahamian female swimmers
Olympic swimmers of the Bahamas
Swimmers at the 2007 Pan American Games
Swimmers at the 2015 Pan American Games
Pan American Games gold medalists for the Bahamas
Pan American Games bronze medalists for the Bahamas
Medalists at the FINA World Swimming Championships (25 m)
Swimmers at the 2014 Commonwealth Games
Commonwealth Games silver medallists for the Bahamas
Commonwealth Games medallists in swimming
Pan American Games medalists in swimming
Bolles School alumni
Central American and Caribbean Games gold medalists for the Bahamas
Central American and Caribbean Games silver medalists for the Bahamas
Central American and Caribbean Games bronze medalists for the Bahamas
Competitors at the 2006 Central American and Caribbean Games
Competitors at the 2010 Central American and Caribbean Games
Competitors at the 2014 Central American and Caribbean Games
Central American and Caribbean Games medalists in swimming
Medalists at the 2007 Pan American Games
Medalists at the 2015 Pan American Games
Medallists at the 2014 Commonwealth Games